The Nebraska–Oklahoma football rivalry is an American college football rivalry between the Nebraska Cornhuskers football team of the University of Nebraska and Oklahoma Sooners football team of the University of Oklahoma. The rivalry continued in the Big 12 Conference until 2010, though the rivalry was more prominent when both teams were members of the former Big Eight Conference before 1996. The annual series effectively ended when Oklahoma was lined up in the Southern division of the newly formed Big 12 to maintain its rivalry with Texas and also its recruiting hotbeds in Texas. As both teams won their respective divisions in 2010, they met in the 2010 Big 12 Championship Game. Following the 2010 season, Nebraska left the Big 12 for the Big Ten Conference. As a result, the 2009 meeting turned out to be the last regular-season scheduled meeting. Nebraska's departure left the future of the rivalry in doubt. The two teams agreed to play a home-and-home non-conference series scheduled for 2021 in Norman (to celebrate the 50th anniversary of the 1971 classic) and 2022 in Lincoln. Additional games have also been scheduled for 2029 and 2030.

The rivalry had been less intense since the 1996 forming of the Big 12 Conference. This was due to the split-division nature of the Big 12 that scheduled the Cornhuskers and Sooners to meet only twice every four years. Before the beginning of Big 12 play in 1996, the Cornhuskers and Sooners had met for 71 straight years.

The 1923 game, only the fifth time these teams met, was the first game played in Memorial Stadium in Lincoln, Nebraska.

These teams have been involved in several historic match-ups, such as the Game of the Century (November 25, 1971), where the teams came into the game ranked one and two in the Associated Press Poll, often making these games of great importance in deciding the national championship. Historically, the rivalry's most distinguishing quality had been the grudging respect and appreciation between the two tradition-rich programs. Also of note is the game's former status as the premier Thanksgiving Day game (or Friday) for the middle of the country.

Oklahoma gave Nebraska their only regular-season losses in 1964, 1966, 1975, 1979, and 1987, while Nebraska did the same to Oklahoma in 1971 and 1978, when they met twice; once in the regular season with a Nebraska home win (to stop a six-game Sooner streak), and at the Orange Bowl with an Oklahoma victory.

The 1959 meeting is often considered Nebraska’s biggest upset ever. On that Halloween day, the unranked Cornhuskers defeated No. 19 Oklahoma 25–21 in Lincoln, ending the Sooners' 74-game conference win streak and their 16-game win streak over Nebraska.

The 1963 matchup was almost canceled because of the assassination of President John F. Kennedy the day before,  but ultimately both schools agreed to go ahead with the game.  It was one of only five played that day (the others were Tulane-LSU, Texas Tech-Arkansas, Florida State-Auburn and Florida-Miami) as all others around the country were canceled.

Former Nebraska head coach Bo Pelini served as an assistant at Oklahoma in 2004.

End of the rivalry
When the Big 8 Conference merged with Texas A&M, Texas Tech, Texas, and Baylor to form the Big XII, Oklahoma sided with the majority of conference members and voted against having an annual division-crossover rivalry game.  The new conference was split into divisions, with Nebraska in the North and Oklahoma in the south, where they would play one another twice every four years.

On June 11, 2010, the University of Nebraska announced that its regents had unanimously voted to end the university's affiliation with the Big 12 Conference, and would be joining the Big Ten Conference beginning with the 2011 season. The two teams met one final time in the 2010 Big 12 Championship Game before Nebraska joined the Big Ten, which Oklahoma won 23–20.

In 2016, the schools announced a home-and-home series for 2029 and 2030.

Game results

See also  
 List of NCAA college football rivalry games

References

College football rivalries in the United States
Nebraska Cornhuskers football
Oklahoma Sooners football